Manuel Ferreira Abreu Freitas (8 January 1959 – 10 May 2022) was a French-Portuguese football coach and player. He played as a defender for Red Star, Poissy, Reims, Paris Saint-Germain, Nancy, Sporting Braga, Quimper, Charleville and US Lusitanos Saint-Maur.

He coached several French teams, including Sénart-Moissy, Reims and Calais.

References

External links
Player profile

1959 births
2022 deaths
People from Fafe
Association football defenders
French footballers
Portuguese footballers
Red Star F.C. players
AS Poissy players
Stade de Reims players
Paris Saint-Germain F.C. players
AS Nancy Lorraine players
S.C. Braga players
Quimper Kerfeunteun F.C. players
OFC Charleville players
US Lusitanos Saint-Maur players
Ligue 1 players
Ligue 2 players
French football managers
Portuguese football managers
Stade de Reims managers
Calais RUFC managers
US Sénart-Moissy players
AS Saint-Priest players
FC Chartres players
FC Rouen players
Sportspeople from Braga District